Xiaoyong Chen (born 13 May 1955) is a Chinese composer living in Germany.

Biography
Xiaoyong Chen first studied composition at the Beijing Central Conservatory of Music from 1980 until 1985. In 1985 he moved to Germany where he attended the Music Academy of Hamburg to complete his studies with György Ligeti.
Chen works frequently as a Guest Professor in Taiwan, Hong Kong, China, and other places. Since 1987 he has been a professor at the Hochschule für Musik und Theater Hamburg at the Asia-Africa Institute and he is self-employed.

Style
Chen's style of composition is close to the Asian mentality, where the creation and development of the sound is in the centre of attention. His works consist of a seemingly simple sound event which will develop in unexpected ways. Chen regards the process of composing as communication with the sound; he tries to find and show the possibilities the sound provides. It is for this reason that Chen's works create an open atmosphere which leads, while listening, to the impression that neither composer nor listener can know where the music is leading.

Key works
 Warp
 1994, for chamber orchestra
 Evapora
 1996, for ensemble
 Invisible Landscapes
 1998, for zheng, percussion, piano and ensemble
 Interlaced Landscapes
 1999, for orchestra
 Speechlessness, Clearness and Ease
 2004, for mixed ensemble
 Floating Colours
 2006, for orchestra
 Colours of Dreams
 2008, for orchestra

References
 Chen, Xiaoyong | Internationale Musikverlage Hans Sikorski

External links
 Information on composer and worklist: Chen, Xiaoyong | Sikorski Music Publishers

Living people
Chinese male composers
1955 births
Academic staff of the University of Hamburg
Chinese expatriates in Germany
Chinese composers